Each character is shown with its equivalent Unicode code point. Only the second half of the table (code points 128–255) is shown, the first half (code points 0–127) being the same as ASCII.

IBM uses code page 1281 (CCSID 1281) for Mac OS Turkish.

 The character 0xF0 is a solid Apple logo. Apple uses U+F8FF in the Corporate Private Use Area for this logo, but it is usually not supported on non-Apple platforms.

References

Character sets
Turkish